Dearborn Center for Math, Science and Technology (DCMST) is a specialized secondary education center with a four-year advanced, research based, science and math curriculum located in Dearborn Heights, Michigan. The school was founded in 2001, with its first graduating class in 2005. Most of the school is located in the Henry Ford Community College building, but some of the Michael Berry Career Center (MBCC) building is also used by DCMST. About 75 students are selected each year from the three high schools in the Dearborn City School District. Once in the program, students are committed for four years. In freshman and sophomore year, students attend their three classes at DCMST in the afternoon from 11:15 to 1:55. Juniors and seniors attend in the morning from 7:35 to 10:15. The other three hours are spent at student's home school. DCMST is a member of the NCSSSMST, an alliance of specialized high schools in the United States whose focus is advanced preparatory studies in mathematics, science and technology. The school is also accredited by the North Central Association (NCA) as all other Dearborn Public Schools are.

Admission
DCMST takes admission applications from any 8th grade middle school student in the Dearborn City School District to fill all available spaces.  These applications include a variety of information including an essay, teacher recommendations, and past standardized test scores. This application process makes sure that a student's academic ability is not the only information used to decide whether that student will be admitted or not as there are many academically strong students in the district.  There are around 180 students that apply for 78 spaces that are available at DCMST.  The available spaces are distributed to a pretty equal number of students that will be attending each of the three 'home' high schools of Dearborn High School, Edsel Ford High School, and Fordson High School.

Curriculum

Freshman year
Honors Chemistry (Two Semesters)
Honors Integrated Mathematics 2 (Two Semesters)
AP Computer Science Principles (Two Semesters)

Sophomore year
Honors Biology (Two Semesters)
Functions, Statistics, and Trigonometry (Two Semesters)
AP Seminar (Two Semesters)

Junior year
Honors Physics (Two Semesters)
Pre-calculus (One (Accelerated) or Two (Honors) Semesters)
Dual-enrollment Calculus at HFCC or University of Michigan–Dearborn (UMD) (One Semester)
Optional if someone takes only one semester of pre-calculus
Calculus Foundations (One Semester)
Optional if someone takes only one semester of pre-calculus
Two semesters of an elective

Senior year
Dual-enrollment Calculus at HFCC or UMD (One or Two Semesters) or AP Calculus (Two Semesters)
In some cases, another approved mathematics course such as AP Statistics can be substituted for a calculus course
Four semesters of electives

Electives

Students may also take an approved math, science, or technology-related dual-enrollment class at Henry Ford Community College or University of Michigan–Dearborn (1 semester).

In addition, students have been allowed to take an AP science class such as AP Chemistry or AP Biology at their home school and take their history class at the Michael Berry Career Center. This exception is made because DCMST does not currently offer these courses.

As of the 2009–2010 school year, DCMST no longer offers AP Computer Science AB because of the discontinuation of AP Computer Science AB by the College Board.

Online learning
DCMST has been involved in using the internet as a tool to connect teachers, students, and parents together. A handful of systems have been used over the school's history, but the current online system being used by DCMST is the iLearn system based on Moodle and hosted by the Dearborn Public Schools website.

Through iLearn, DCMST teachers and other Dearborn Public Schools can give students easy online access to many things for their classes. Common items posted on iLearn by DCMST teachers include weekly syllabi, rubrics, quizzes, tests, documents, school news, individual student grades, and links to helpful sites.

Extra-curricular activities
MC2 (Math Competition Club)
Supervised by Kim Shawver and Jennifer Gorsline
Invent Club(No longer active as of 2012)
Supervised by Jeff Whittaker
Open Gym/Movie Night (Assorted Fridays)
Hosted by one of the grade levels
Open Computer Lab Usage (Assorted Weekdays)
Innovative Vehicle Design Club (IVD)
Supervised by John Bayerl
School Newspaper, Nerdschool Times(No longer active)
Supervised by one of the grade levels
Environmental Science Club
Supervised by Steven Scott

Field trips
Many of the field trips taken at DCMST do not include all students, as some have a limited number of spaces that are given out on a first-come, first-served basis.
A handful to local colleges and universities such as University of Michigan–Dearborn, Henry Ford Community College, and Wayne State University (Yearly)
The Michigan High School Math and Science Symposium - MHSMSS (Spring; Yearly)
Sponsored by the Regional Math and Science Center at Grand Valley State University and Southwest Michigan Alliance of Mathematics, Science and Technology Centers
The NCSSSMST Student Conference (Fall; Yearly)
New York, New York (2003)
DCMST hosted the 2004 NCSSSMST Student Conference
Atlanta, Georgia (2005)
Salt Lake City, Utah (2006)
Washington, D.C./Virginia (2007)
Rochester, New York (2008)
Melbourne, Florida (2008)
Philadelphia, Pennsylvania (2009)
Detroit Science Center (Depending on current special exhibit)
Physics Day at Cedar Point (Yearly; Juniors Only)
The NCSSSMST Student Research Symposium (June; Yearly)

Competitions
DCMST Science Fair (Winter; Yearly)
Science and Engineering Fair of Metro Detroit (SEFMD) (March; Yearly)
Intel International Science and Engineering Fair (ISEF) (Yearly)
Internet Science and Technology Fair (ISTF) (Yearly)
Michigan Statistics Poster Contest (Yearly)
Young Epidemiology Scholars (Yearly)

Special events
Senior Honor Ceremony (Yearly)
Also referred to as the Senior Celebration of Excellence
Probability Fair (May; Yearly)
Celebration (Monthly)
Clean-up and Improvement of Boatin Pond (May–June; Yearly)
Guest Speakers
College professors on specific scientific topics
Those in scientific, mathematical, or technological career fields (e.g. engineers, pharmacists)

Student body
There are a total of 260 students that currently attend DCMST.

Leadership
For each year at DCMST, there are elections that take place for class leaders. During the freshmen year, there is a council of 4 students from each home high school that are elected for a total of 12 students that will lead the freshmen class in things such as fundraising. From the sophomore year to the senior year, a President, Vice-President, Secretary, and Treasurer are elected annually by the students of that class to serve in leading things such as fundraising and out-of-school activities such as a class field trip in their senior year.

Achievement
DCMST actively supports students in undertaking participation in competitions, scholarship searches, and more. Many students have won recognition at SEFMD and a few have even made it to the International Science and Engineering Fair put on by the Intel Corporation. One competition that every student enters with a team of other students in their ninth grade year is the Internet Science and Technology Fair. There have been many teams from DCMST that have won recognition or made it to the finals of the fair where a website must be submitted on an invention dealing with science and technology. Many other students have submitted essays, research papers, and more to scholarship competitions such as those held by Dupont, Raytheon, and other corporations and organizations. DCMST students are encouraged to go ahead with their own research project in their junior or senior year - even if they do not take the research class. There are many other competitions that DCMST students enter throughout their 4 years at the school.

The Academic Achievement Profile of all Students in the Senior Class of DCMST by Year:

Drop outs
During the history of DCMST thus far, there have been students that have chosen to quit DCMST and resign from the spot that they had been awarded during the admissions process. These resignations usually come after the freshmen or sophomore year as students realize that he/she believes the program is too rigorous or that he/she does not want to go into a field involving math, science, and technology specifically. The latter is why many of the students who have dropped out have done so, as he/she wants to go into the arts. Many students that attend DCMST like the arts along with math, science, and technology. Others have moved out of the district.

Parent involvement
The DCMST teachers and staff have continued to try to keep parents involved with the school, events, fundraising, and more. There are monthly parent meetings held throughout the school year where many things are discussed from colleges and scholarships to event planning and fundraising ideas. The meetings are usually held on Tuesdays.

Fundraising
Fundraising is done around the year at DCMST by the different grade levels. Each grade level has their own pot of funds to hold events with and to add to with their own fundraising initiatives. Some fundraising techniques that have been used include bake sales, T-shirt sales, cosmic bowling, penny wars, and the open gym/movie night.

It has also become tradition for the junior class to be responsible for the different aspects of the Senior Honor Ceremony. This responsibility includes members of the junior class funding and/or donating materials to cover aspects such as refreshments after the ceremony and the décor for the evening and actually working at the ceremony (e.g. set-up, serving refreshments, clean-up).

Grants and scholarships are another source of funds for all of DCMST as the grant money helps to pay for or lower the costs for the students for things such as field trips.

School improvement
In the 2006–2007 school year, DCMST staff and teachers have been pushing students to use credible sources and use proper citation formats when writing research papers and conducting projects. The teachers have pushed to get students to understand and know the APA, MLA, and sometimes AMA formats for research papers/projects and other assignments. The teachers also do not allow students to use Wikipedia as a credible source of information at all.

Another improvement that is underway is a standardized lab report format for all DCMST classes that will be followed for all four years of the student's time at DCMST.

References

External links
DCMST Home Page
Dearborn Public Schools Home Page
iLearn Home Page

Public high schools in Michigan
NCSSS schools
Educational institutions established in 2001
Schools in Wayne County, Michigan
2001 establishments in Michigan
Dearborn Heights, Michigan